The African Free School was a school for children of slaves and free people of color in New York City. It was founded by members of the New York Manumission Society, including Alexander Hamilton and John Jay, on November 2, 1787. Many of its alumni became leaders in the African-American community in New York.

History
The school was founded by the New York Manumission Society, an organization that advocated the full abolition of African slavery. In 1785 the group gained passage of a New York state law prohibiting the sale of slaves who were imported into the state. This preceded the national law prohibiting the slave trade, which went into effect in 1808.  The New York law also eased restrictions on the manumission of enslaved Africans.  The society's members were all white, male, wealthy, and influential. The society was founded by John Jay, a statesman and abolitionist, and included Alexander Hamilton among its members.

Established in 1794, the first school was a one-room school house that held about 40 students. Originally the Manumission Society hired white teachers, but it eventually employed black teachers as well. It was an early form of "charity schooling," supported by donations for the city's poorest residents.  In 1809 the school's trustees hired Charles C. Andrews, an English immigrant, to teach at the school.  Andrews used the methods of Joseph Lancaster, a British school reformer whose system employed student assistants or "monitors," permitting a single teacher to conduct classes as large as several hundred. By all accounts, Andrews was passionately committed to the idea that his black students were just as bright as whites, if not even smarter.  Under his leadership the institution grew significantly, moving to a new building on William St in 1815.  Five years later an even bigger facility was opened on Mulberry St, near Grand.  By then enrollment was approaching 700, and the schools were gaining a wide reputation for success.  Andrews published a book in 1821 celebrating the schools' accomplishments, and they became a frequent stopping point for visitors to the city.

After opening yet another school, with enrollment surpassing a thousand children, a crisis unfolded in the early 1830s. Andrews publicly advocated the idea that American blacks should set up a colony in Africa, as was being done in Liberia by the American Colonization Society. This was one of the period's most controversial racial issues, as by this time most American blacks were native born and their goal was to achieve equal political rights in the United States.  Black students boycotted the schools, leading to Andrews' dismissal in 1832. The administration hired black teachers to replace whites in each of the city's African Free Schools. By 1835, when the schools ended their run as privately supported institutions, the African Free School had seven buildings in different neighborhoods, and it had educated thousands of girls and boys. At that time the African Free Schools and their facilities were integrated into the public school system. This was several years after New York freed the last adult slaves under its gradual abolition law.

The state had passed a gradual emancipation law in 1799: it provided that children of enslaved mothers would be born free, but were required to have lengthy periods as indentured servants, to 28 years of age for men and 25 for women, before being legally and socially free. Gradually, existing adult slaves were freed, until the last were freed in 1827.

Notable alumni
Dr. James McCune Smith, the first African American to earn a university medical degree, physician, writer and abolitionist.
Ira Aldridge, actor and abolitionist activist
Alexander Crummell, minister and early black nationalist
George T. Downing, caterer and abolitionist
Henry Highland Garnet, minister and abolitionist
Patrick H. Reason, engraver
Charles Lewis Reason, first African-American college professor, abolitionist
Samuel Ringgold Ward, a cousin of Garnet

See also
New York Manumission Society
African Free School alumni
James McCune Smith
Peter Williams Jr.
Patrick H. Reason
Abiel Smith School
John Teasman

References

Further reading
John L. Rury, "The New York African Free School, 1827-1836: Community Conflict over Community Control of Black Education," Phylon, Vol. 44, No. 3 (1983) pp. 187–197.

Sources

External links
African Free School  at New-York Historical Society
Finding Aid for African Free School Records, New-York Historical Society

Historically black schools
History of New York City
Historically segregated African-American schools in New York (state)
1787 establishments in New York (state)
Defunct schools in New York City
African-American history in New York City
Antebellum educational institutions that admitted African Americans
Educational institutions established in 1787
Private elementary schools in Manhattan
1835 disestablishments in New York (state)
Underground Railroad in New York (state)